Boston Township may refer to the following places in the United States:

 Boston Township, Madison County, Arkansas
 Boston Township, Washington County, Arkansas
 Boston Township, Wayne County, Indiana
 Boston Township, Michigan
 Boston Township, Summit County, Ohio

Township name disambiguation pages